Macropoliana gessi is a moth of the  family Sphingidae which is endemic to South Africa.

References

gessi
Moths described in 2006
Moths of Africa